Françoise Faucher O.C. is a Quebec actress born in Montmorency, France in 1929. She trained in drama in France under René Simon and Bernard Bimont before immigrating to Canada in the 1950s. She became a member of Montreal's Théâtre du Nouveau Monde, participating in many plays.  She wrote scripts for radio and TV programs, sparking off a productive career as a moderator. Although most of her work has been in live theatre, her credits include many French-Canadian TV series such as: Les Mont-Joye, Les Bergers, La pension Velder, etc.  Faucher was appointed an Officer of the Order of Canada in 1982.
In 2010, she received the Governor General's Performing Arts Award.

References

External links
Watch The Sentry, a short film about Françoise Faucher created for the Governor General's Performing Arts Awards
 

1929 births
Living people
People from Montmorency, Val-d'Oise
French film actresses
Actresses from Montreal
Canadian film actresses
Canadian stage actresses
Officers of the Order of Canada
Governor General's Performing Arts Award winners